Afton is an unincorporated community in Clermont County, in the U.S. state of Ohio.

History
A post office called California was established in 1849, the name was changed to Afton in 1865, and the post office closed in 1912. Besides the post office, Afton had a station on the Cincinnati & Eastern Railroad, today the Cincinnati Eastern Railroad (CCET).

References

Unincorporated communities in Clermont County, Ohio
Unincorporated communities in Ohio